Sergey Andreevich Kuvaev (born July 19, 1984) is a Russian actor, model and videoblogger in Japan.

Biography 
Sergey Kuvaev was born in Zhukovsky, Moscow Oblast, Russia. He developed a great interest for Japanese culture while studying at college, and begun learning Japanese at the age of 25. He has then moved to Japan and worked as a journalist, but also got success in acting and modeling. Because of his passion in acting and close to native Japanese language ability, he played many roles which required to speak not just English or Russian, but also Japanese lines.

Filmography

Films

Miscellaneous crew

YouTube 
Sergey is also a video blogger. He makes videos in Russian about the life in Japan. He has a YouTube channel and more than 1,000,000 subscribers.

References

External links 
 
 
 
 

1984 births
Living people
People from Zhukovsky, Moscow Oblast
Russian male actors
Russian male models
Russian YouTubers
Russian expatriates in Japan
Russian video bloggers